State Route 42 (SR 42) is a decommissioned state highway in the southern region part of the U.S. state of California, running along Manchester Avenue, Manchester Boulevard and Firestone Boulevard in Los Angeles and the cities south of it. After 1968, it ran from State Route 1 west of Inglewood (near Los Angeles International Airport) east to Interstate 5 in Norwalk. Though signed as SR 42, it was officially Route 105 until it was replaced by the parallel Interstate 105 on October 14, 1993. The entire route was deleted from the California Freeway and Expressway System in 2000, with the remaining portion of SR 42 being relinquished to local jurisdictions in that year, but the route is still occasionally signed as SR 42.

Route description
Manchester Avenue begins in Los Angeles near the Pacific Ocean at Vista del Mar Lane, and becomes a major road at Pershing Drive going east. The part west of Lincoln Boulevard (State Route 1) was never a numbered route. East of Sepulveda Boulevard, Manchester Avenue crosses into Inglewood where it is known as Manchester Boulevard. It jogs about two blocks to the north just west of Interstate 405, and back to the south after passing downtown Inglewood. Upon crossing back into Los Angeles, it is again Manchester Avenue.

At Central Avenue, the road leaves L.A. and into Florence-Graham (unincorporated LA County city). It becomes Firestone Boulevard and passes through South Gate, Downey, and ending in Norwalk at a merge with Interstate 5 (the Santa Ana Freeway); where SR 42 would've ended. The name continues however on the frontage roads of I-5 until it enters Buena Park at Artesia Boulevard, where the name changes back to Manchester Boulevard until Orangethorpe Avenue. Manchester Boulevard in Buena Park was changed to Auto Center Drive in August 2006.  The frontage road begins again in Anaheim, named Manchester Avenue in several pieces between Euclid Street and State College Boulevard.

Metro Local line 115 operates on Manchester Avenue and Firestone Boulevard.

Manchester Avenue serves a Metro J Line station underneath the Harbor Freeway.

Firestone Boulevard intersects with the Metro A Line light rail, served by the station of the same name in Florence-Graham.

History
Legislative Route 174 was defined in 1933 to run from pre-1964 Legislative Route 60 west of Inglewood east to pre-1964 Legislative Route 2 near Santa Ana. It was signed as State Route 10 in the initial signage of routes in 1934, running from State Route 3 (now State Route 1) to U.S. Route 101 near the present junction of Interstate 5 and Anaheim Boulevard. (US 101 and LR 2 left the current I-5 alignment north onto Anaheim Boulevard, eventually entering downtown Los Angeles via present State Route 72.)

Note: the present alignment of I-5 between Chapman Avenue in Anaheim and Main Street in Santa Ana was also part of LR 174, after a short concurrency of LR 2 and LR 174 in Anaheim. LR 2 used those two streets through Orange, but US 101 was moved to LR 174 once it was built, and so that part of LR 174 was never signed as SR 10. The bypassed section of LR 2 became State Route 51 in the 1964 renumbering, but was removed from the state highway system in 1965.

By 1942, the piece of SR 10 east of State Route 19 (Lakewood Boulevard) had been designated U.S. Route 101 Bypass. U.S. Route 101 moved to the present Interstate 5 alignment, formerly US 101 Bypass, by 1959, and SR 10 was truncated to the present I-5/Firestone Boulevard junction.

Around 1960, SR 10 was renumbered to State Route 42 due to the nearby Interstate 10 (numbered in 1957). This change, which would have normally happened in the 1964 renumbering, was done early due to the closeness of I-10. Route 42 was legislatively defined in that renumbering, running not only from SR 1 to I-5, but beyond to State Route 91 in Anaheim Hills. This route split from the existing SR 42 in Norwalk and ran east along unbuilt pre-1964 Legislative Route 176 to the intersection of State Route 39 (Beach Boulevard) and Imperial Highway. East of SR 39, Imperial Highway was state-maintained, and carried pre-1964 LR 176 and post-1964 SR 42 to its end at SR 91. The whole route, from SR 1 to SR 91, had been added to the California Freeway and Expressway System in 1959.

In 1965, the unbuilt part from Interstate 605 east to SR 39 was transferred to State Route 90, which had been defined in 1964 to end at I-605; this left a gap in SR 42. The part of SR 42 west of I-605 was added to the Interstate Highway System as Interstate 105 in March 1968, and the legislative changes were made that year - that piece became Route 105, and the piece east of SR 39 became a further extension of SR 90.

Despite being officially Route 105 since 1968, the route continued to be signed as SR 42, not only along its defined alignment from SR 1 to I-605, but past I-605 to Interstate 5 (which had loosely become part of SR 90 in 1965).

Interstate 105 was constructed from 1982 to 1994. Even after the new route was finished, the old route continued to be signed as SR 42, even after the last section was relinquished in mid-2000. Some signs still remained in 2004. Since the widening of Interstate 5 between Interstate 605 and the Los Angeles-Orange County line, Firestone Boulevard does not connect with it anymore, instead ending at Bloomfield Avenue. Access to Firestone Boulevard from I-5 is now via Rosecrans Avenue.

Major intersections

See also

References

External links

California @ AARoads.com - State Route 42
California Highways: SR 42

042
State Route 042
State Route 042
Transportation in Los Angeles
Inglewood, California
Downey, California
Norwalk, California
U.S. Route 101